Mammillaria duwei is a species of flowering plant in the cactus family. It is endemic to Mexico, where it occurs only in the state of Guanajuato. It is known from only one location. It is known commonly as the biznaguita.

This is a critically endangered species due to its limited distribution and illegal collecting for trade. There are perhaps 500 mature individuals left in the wild.

Notes

References

 Species description. Mammillarias.net.

duwei
Cacti of Mexico
Endemic flora of Mexico
Flora of Guanajuato
Endangered biota of Mexico
Endangered plants
Taxonomy articles created by Polbot